Richard W. West was the mayor of Newport News, Virginia from 1932 to 1936.

References

Mayors of Newport News, Virginia
Year of birth missing
Year of death missing